Der Mann, der sich in Luft auflöste (“The man who disappeared into thin air”) (Swedish: Mannen som gick upp i rök) is a German 1980 police film about Martin Beck, directed by Péter Bacsó.

Plot
During the height of a Cold War, a drunken reporter from Sweden disappears without a trace while on a business trip in Budapest. Meanwhile, the tabloid for which he was writing sounds an alarm, with the Swedish government trying to avoid direct confrontation with the Hungarian police. Martin Beck, a detective, takes the case, and is sent behind enemy lines as a private citizen, to find the reporter and bring him back to Sweden. However, the official of the homicide commission faces a dilemma: How will he be able to locate a Swedish national in a city of two million? They need to interrogate charming Ari, a Hungarian girlfriend of the missing person, to gather the clues on his whereabouts.

Cast
Derek Jacobi as Martin Beck
Judy Winter as Aina Mattsson
Lasse Strömstedt as Kollberg
Ferenc Bàcs as Major Szluka
Krisztina Peremartoni as Aranka Ari
Tomas Bolme as Åke Gunnarsson
Thomas Oredsson as Alf Mattsson
Kjell Bergqvist as Stenström
Mari Szür as Mrs Bubla
Sándor Szabó as Sós
Zoltán Gera as Kuti
Dieter Schidor as Embassy Secretary
Helena Brodin as Mrs Beck

External links

West German films
Hungarian crime drama films
Swedish crime drama films
Martin Beck films
1980s German films
1980s Swedish films